Widney Manor railway station serves the Widney Manor area of Solihull in the West Midlands of England. The station is served by West Midlands Trains (who manage the station) and Chiltern Railways. A significant portion of the car park occupies what used to be the formation when the line was four tracks wide and the former GWR London Paddington - Birkenhead Woodside service passed through the station but did not stop. This service ceased with the electrification of the former LMS line from London Euston to Birmingham New Street in 1967.

Services
The Birmingham trains continue to either ,  or Worcester Shrub Hill/Foregate Street. Chiltern only provide a limited service at the station in the late evening.

References

External links

Rail Around Birmingham and the West Midlands: Widney Manor station

Railway stations in Solihull
DfT Category E stations
Former Great Western Railway stations
Railway stations in Great Britain opened in 1899
Railway stations served by Chiltern Railways
Railway stations served by West Midlands Trains